Pureness may refer to:

Purity (disambiguation)
"Pureness" (Aya Ueto song)
"Pureness" (Nana Kitade song)